Commons is a ward of Christchurch, Dorset. Since 2019, the ward has elected 2 councillors to Bournemouth, Christchurch and Poole Council.

History 
The ward comprises the former Christchurch Borough Council wards of St Catherine's & Hum and Jumpers now defunct Jumpers ward formerly elected 2 councillors to Christchurch Borough Council.

Geography 
The ward covers the Jumpers Common and Fairmile areas of Christchurch. The southern border of the ward follows the River Stour. Other rural parts of the ward include; Hurn, East Parley and Parley Common. The ward is the largest in the council. Commons ward includes Bournemouth International Airport.

Councillors

Commons

Former Wards

St Catherine's and Hurn Ward

Jumpers

Election results

2021 by-election 
The seat was won by independent candidate Vanessa Helen Ricketts.

2019

2015

References 

Wards of Bournemouth, Christchurch and Poole
Politics of Christchurch, Dorset